Fenix Trophy is an annual football semi-professional and amateur European club competition organised since 2021.

References

External links

 Official website 

 
2021 establishments in Europe
Recurring sporting events established in 2021